Thimmapur is a village in Thimmapur mandal of Karimnagar district in the state of Telangana in India.

References 

Villages in Karimnagar district
Mandal headquarters in Karimnagar district